The Icelandic Swimming Association is the national governing body for aquatics in Iceland. It is affiliated to both LEN and FINA.

SSÍ brings together all the swimming clubs in the country, organizes the national championships and manages the national team.

References

External links
 www.sundsamband.is—SSÍ website

Iceland
Swimming
Swimming organizations
Swimming in Iceland
1951 establishments in Iceland